Margaret Anne Kirkpatrick (née Downs; born 29 January 1941)  is an Australian stage and screen actress 
who has appeared in numerous theatre, television and feature film roles since the late 1950s .

Kirkpatrick, is probably best known for starring in the cult TV series Prisoner (otherwise known as Prisoner: Cell Block H in the UK and North America), where both locally and internationally for her portrayal of the character "The Freak" Joan Ferguson, a sinister and cold lesbian prison officer.

She performed as in an Australian production of the musical Wicked as Madame Morrible
 
Kirkpatrick has appeared in numerous TV series including Richmond Hill, Water Rats, G.P. and Blue Heelers, as well as two roles in All Saints and Home and Away
 
In 2019, she released her autobiography The Gloves Are Off: The Inside Story From Prisoner to Wicked

Biography

Margaret Anne Downs was born in Albury, New South Wales, to James and Crissie Downs. When she was seven months old her father was killed while on active national service as a soldier in North Africa, leaving her mother to bring her up alone. Her mother later married John Anderson and had a son, Adrian. The family moved to Newcastle, New South Wales, where Kirkpatrick grew up. She had had an interest in acting from an early age, and appeared in several school plays. By November 1955 she became fed up with school and left, whereupon her mother sent her to drama lessons.

In 1960, at the age of 19, Kirkpatrick took her first professional acting job, with theatre impresario John Alden's Shakespeare Company. After this initial production she promptly gave up acting. Kirkpatrick subsequently took various jobs, including working in dress shop, as a medical receptionist, compère of fashion parades, and she also had jobs in bars, restaurants, and hotels.

Downs married Norman Kirkpatrick, a merchant seaman of the Shankill Road in Belfast, in September 1963. Five years later they moved to Sydney where Kirkpatrick decided to resume her acting career. After appearing in two plays she put her acting career on hold once again, this time due to the arrival of her daughter Caitlin. Kirkpatrick resumed theatre work as Caitlin got older from 1964 onwards, and from 1976 onwards moved on to television and cinema.

Kirkpatrick appeared in the music video for "Anthem for the Year 2000" by rock band Silverchair.

She is a strong supporter of gay rights, having made numerous appearances at "Fair Day" as part of the annual Sydney Gay and Lesbian Mardi Gras Festival. She has been awarded the Sydney Gay Community's DIVA award for her work.

Kirkpatrick returned to TV in 2017 after a 9-year hiatus, having in recent years appearing primarily in theatre roles, appearing in Australian TV mini-series The Letdown.

Personal life
In July 2015, Kirkpatrick was charged with child sexual assault against a 13-year-old girl in the 1980s. She strongly denied the allegations and said she would fight to clear her name of the two counts of indecent assault and one count of gross indecency with a person under the age of 16. In a statement Kirkpatrick said, "Yes, allegations have been levelled at me. Are they true? Absolutely not." She appeared in court in August 2015 and was found guilty on 20 August. She was subsequently sentenced to an 18-month community corrections order, including 100 hours of community service. Kirkpatrick successfully appealed the case and won, with Judge Geoffrey Chettle finding that there was reasonable doubt surrounding the circumstances, and dismissing the conviction and charges.

Filmography

FILM

TELEVISION

Theatre
Source: AusStage

Awards

Mo Awards
The Australian Entertainment Mo Awards (commonly known informally as the Mo Awards), were annual Australian entertainment industry awards. They recognise achievements in live entertainment in Australia from 1975 to 2016. Maggie Kirkpatrick won one award in that time.
 (wins only)
|-
| 2000
| Maggie Kirkpatrick
| Female Actor in a Play
| 
|-

References

External links

1941 births
Living people
Actresses from New South Wales
Australian film actresses
Australian soap opera actresses
Australian stage actresses
Australian LGBT rights activists
Overturned convictions in Australia
People from Albury, New South Wales
People acquitted of sex crimes
20th-century Australian actresses
21st-century Australian actresses